Calliandra tweediei is a species of flowering plants of the genus Calliandra in the family Fabaceae. The plant is native to the Atlantic Forest ecoregion in southeastern Brazil.

References

tweediei
Endemic flora of Brazil
Flora of the Atlantic Forest
Taxa named by George Bentham